Shohadaye Soffe Expressway is an expressway in southern Isfahan, Iran. It connects Shiraz Road to Agharabparast Expressway.

Streets in Isfahan